Armando Bó (3 May 19148 October 1981) was an Argentine film actor, director, producer, screenwriter and score composer of the classic era. He made drama and sexploitation films of the 1960s and 1970s starring his favorite actress and romantic partner, sex symbol Isabel Sarli. His works include Thunder Among the Leaves, which features the first nude scene in an Argentine film.

Bó's son is the actor Víctor Bó and his grandson is the screenwriter Armando Bó.

Biography
Bó began acting for film in 1939 in Ambición and made some 50 film appearances as an actor, but by the late 1940s he had already taken up an interest in film production and began as a director, producer, actor, and screenwriter in the early 1950s. He was involved in almost 100 different films during his career.

In June 1956, he met Isabel Sarli on a television show. He later offered her the opportunity to star in El trueno entre las hojas (Thunder in the Leaves). Bo tricked Sarli to appear naked in a scene in which she bathed in a lake, though she had previously been told she would wear a flesh-colored body stocking. The film became the first to feature full frontal nudity in Argentine cinema. Bo and Sarli became lovers and he continued to exploit her in his films, many, in which she was asked to perform sex acts on film always starring him as her lover. She became the primary star of his films until his death in 1981. Upon his death Sarli was given no rights to any of the films they made together.

Their films were controversial at the time and most of them were banned, but this ban led them to be even more successful. Films like Fuego (1969) and Fiebre (1970) reached the American and European markets. The banning of Fuego led to them moving into exile.

He was married to Teresa Machinandiarena, and had three children: María Inés, María Jesús, and Víctor. His son, Víctor Bó, was a prominent actor in Argentina during the 70s and 80s. His grandsons are Academy Award winners Nicolás Giacobone and Armando Bó Jr., credited as Armando Bó.

Filmography

Legacy 
Renowned filmmaker John Waters has claimed to be a big fan of Bó's filmography, and to have been influenced by it as well. Waters presented Bó's 1969 cult film Fuego as his annual selection within the 2002 Maryland Film Festival, and it was also a featured film in episode three of the Here! network original series John Waters Presents Movies That Will Corrupt You.

References

External links
 
 

1914 births
1981 deaths
Argentine male film actors
Argentine film directors
Argentine film producers
Argentine film score composers
Male film score composers
Male actors from Buenos Aires
Deaths from brain cancer in Argentina
Burials at La Recoleta Cemetery
20th-century Argentine male actors
20th-century composers
20th-century Argentine male musicians